St Michael's Church is located to the southwest of the English village of Cockerham, Lancashire. It is an active Anglican parish church in the deanery of Lancaster, the archdeaconry of Lancaster and Morecambe, and the diocese of Blackburn. Its benefice is combined with those of Christ Church, Glasson, and St Luke, Winmarleigh. The church is recorded in the National Heritage List for England as a designated Grade II* listed building.

History
The oldest surviving part of the original church building is the tower, which dates from the 16th century. The body of the church had been rebuilt in 1814, and this was replaced again in 1910–11 by the Lancaster architects Austin and Paley. This replacement cost £5,000 (equivalent to £ in ).

Architecture

Exterior
The body of the church is constructed in sandstone rubble, the tower in ashlar, and the roof is slated. The plan consists of a five-bay nave with a clerestory and a two-bay chancel under a continuous roof, north and south aisles, a south transept with a vestry, and a west tower. The tower is in three stages with diagonal buttresses and a battlemented parapet. On the south side is a stair turret. In the tower is a west doorway with a round arch, a three-light west window, and three-light bell openings. The windows in the sides of the aisles and clerestory corresponding to the nave have two lights, and those corresponding to the chancel have three lights. The east window has four lights containing Perpendicular tracery and ogee quatrefoils.

Interior
Inside the church, the arcades between the nave and the aisles are carried on octagonal piers with no capitals. In the chancel is a piscina and a double sedilia. The stained glass in the east window was made by Morris & Co. and depicts the Four Evangelists; the figures of Saint Matthew and Saint John are based on cartoons by Ford Madox Brown, that of Saint Mark by Edward Burne-Jones, and that of Saint Luke by William Morris. The two-manual pipe organ was made in about 1830, possibly by Renn and Boston.

External features

In the churchyard is the 18th-century base of a sundial, which is listed at Grade II.  The churchyard also contains the war graves of a British and a Canadian soldier of World War I.

See also

Grade II* listed buildings in Lancashire
Listed buildings in Cockerham
List of ecclesiastical works by Austin and Paley (1895–1914)

References

Cockerham
Churches completed in 1814
Churches completed in 1911
Cockerham
Cockerham
Cockerham
Cockerham
Cockerham
Austin and Paley buildings
Churches in the City of Lancaster